Eubriinae is an aquatic beetle subfamily in the family Psephenidae.

References

External links 

 Eubriinae at Tree of Life web project

Byrrhoidea
Aquatic insects
Beetle subfamilies